Stivi Vecaj (born 29 January 1994 in Shkodër) is an Albanian football player who most recently played for Tërbuni in the Albanian First Division.

Personal life
He is a cousin of Uendi Vecaj, also a professional football player. In February 2016 they were both omitted from their squads due to a blood feud after a remote family member killed a member from another family.

References

External links
 Profile - FSHF

1994 births
Living people
Footballers from Shkodër
Albanian footballers
Association football midfielders
KF Vllaznia Shkodër players
KS Ada Velipojë players
KF Tërbuni Pukë players
Kategoria Superiore players
Kategoria e Parë players
Kategoria e Dytë players